Karichma Ekoh (born 4 March 1998) is a French-Cameroonian female handball player who plays for Chambray Touraine Handball.

International honours  
Junior World Championship:
Gold Medalist: 2017

Individual awards 
Championnat de France Best Young Player: 2018

References

French female handball players
1998 births
Living people
Sportspeople from Clichy, Hauts-de-Seine